Akhtar Syed Ahsan was an educationist and founder of Islami Mission, Sant Nagar, Lahore, Pakistan he was also a Pir of silsila chishtia from Sanaur, Patiala, Punjab, India. He is the author and co-author of many books of which one particularly famous one is the book Al-Islam, a book for Muslims and especially new Muslims who want to get basic knowledge of Islam.

References

External links
 

1901 births
1997 deaths
Pakistani Sufis
People from Lahore